The 2000 AVC Cup Women's Club Tournament was the 2nd staging of the AVC Club Championships. The tournament was held in Shaoxing, China.

Final standing

References
Asian Volleyball Confederation

A
V
International volleyball competitions hosted by China